Aleksei Gochayevich Tatayev (born 8 October 1998) is a Russian football player. He plays for Alania Vladikavkaz.

Club career
He made his debut in the Russian Professional Football League for FC Krasnodar-2 on 15 April 2015 in a game against FC Alania Vladikavkaz.

He made his debut for the main squad of FC Krasnodar in the Russian Cup game against PFC Spartak Nalchik on 21 September 2016.

On 10 January 2019, he joined Czech club FK Mladá Boleslav until December 2019.

On 11 December 2019, he moved to Mladá Boleslav on a permanent basis.

International career
Tatayev was part of the Russian squad which reached the semi-finals of the 2015 UEFA European Under-17 Championship in Bulgaria. In the quarter-finals on 16 May at Lazur Stadium in Burgas, his first-half header was the only goal of the game, eliminating holders England.

References

External links

1998 births
People from Tskhinvali
Living people
Russian footballers
Russia youth international footballers
Russia under-21 international footballers
Association football defenders
FC Krasnodar players
FC Krasnodar-2 players
FK Mladá Boleslav players
Russian First League players
Russian Second League players
Czech First League players
Russian expatriate footballers
Expatriate footballers in the Czech Republic
Russian expatriate sportspeople in the Czech Republic